Skodsborg Station is a regional railway station serving the suburb and seaside resort of Skodsborg, about 20 km north of central Copenhagen, Denmark.

The station is located on the Coast Line between Helsingør and Copenhagen. The train services are currently operated by Danish State Railways (DSB) which runs a frequent regional rail service to Copenhagen Central Station. Skodsborg is a quiet residential neighbourhood and the station sees mostly local traffic.

History
The station opened in connection with the inauguration of the Coast Line on 2 August 1897.

Architecture
Typical of the stations on the Coast Line, Skodsborg Station is designed by Heinrich Wenck in the National Romantic style. The main station building is located on the east side of the tracks while a pavilion with waiting room is located on their west side.

The station is listed.

See also 
 List of railway stations in Denmark

References

Coast Line (Denmark)
Listed railway stations in Denmark
Listed buildings and structures in Rudersdal Municipality
Heinrich Wenck buildings
Railway stations opened in 1897
National Romantic architecture in Denmark
Art Nouveau railway stations
1897 establishments in Denmark
Railway stations in Denmark opened in the 19th century